The Women's 100m Butterfly event at the 2003 Pan American Games took place on August 15, 2003 (Day 15 of the Games).

Medalists

Records

Results

Notes

References
2003 Pan American Games Results: Day 13, CBC online; retrieved 2009-06-13.
usaswimming

Butterfly, Women's 100m
2003 in women's swimming
Swim